Dominique Bedel (born 20 February 1957) is a former professional tennis player from France.

During his career, Bedel won one singles title. He achieved a career-high singles ranking of world No. 41 in November 1982 and a career-high doubles ranking of world No. 144 in 1983.

Career finals

Singles (1 title)

Doubles (1 runner-up)

External links
 
 

French male tennis players
Sportspeople from Casablanca
1957 births
Living people